Immersion is the third studio album by Australian band Pendulum. The album was announced in early 2009, with the name being confirmed in December 2009. The album was released on 21 May 2010 in Australia and Ireland, and on 24 May for the rest of the world, followed by a UK tour of the album. In January 2010, Pendulum hosted the album preview Ear Storm event at Matter in London in which many top DJs performed sets of their own with Pendulum being the headliners.

The album was finished on 18 April 2010 and mastered by Brian Gardner at Bernie Grundman Mastering Studios in Los Angeles.

Immersion peaked at number one on the UK Albums Chart in its first week of release. The album features a variety of sounds. Although drum and bass is highly featured, electro, house and metal styles are also within the 67-minute long album.

The album features collaborations with Liam Howlett, Steven Wilson and the Swedish melodic death metal band In Flames.

Track listing 

Sample credits
 "We Do the Killing" by Cocoa Tea, written by C. Scott, W. Riley, used on "Set Me on Fire"

B-side
The track "Ransom" was originally included in the album but it was later dropped as it "didn't fit the sound of the album". The band later stated that "Ransom will be either released as a free download to fans or a B-side but it will definitely see the light of day". Rob Swire later stated that "Ransom" won't be released because he found the song to be "boring" after the intro; however, he added that most of the project files for the song were corrupted when his MacBook hard drive malfunctioned. However, on 6 April 2011, "Ransom" was released as a download-only single on the group's website in aid of Japan's earthquake appeal, and it entered the UK Singles Chart at number 193 the following week.

Personnel 
Writing, performance and production credits are adapted from the album liner notes.

Pendulum 
 Rob Swire – vocals on "Watercolour", "Crush", "Under the Waves", "Immunize", "The Island – Pt.I (Dawn)", "The Island – Pt. II (Dusk)", "Comprachicos", "Witchcraft", "Self vs. Self", guitar on "Under the Waves", "Comprachicos"
 Ben Mount – vocals on "The Vulture"
 Peredur ap Gwynedd – guitar on "Crush", "The Vulture", "Witchcraft", "Self vs. Self", "The Fountain", "Encoder"
 Gareth McGrillen – bass guitar on "Comprachicos", "Witchcraft"
 KJ Sawka – drums on "Crush", "Comprachicos", "Witchcraft", "Self vs. Self", "Encoder", percussions on "The Island – Pt.I (Dawn)", "The Island – Pt. II (Dusk)", "The Vulture", "Encoder"

Guest musicians 
 Steven Wilson – vocals on "The Fountain"
 In Flames on "Self vs. Self"
 Anders Fridén – vocals
 Björn Gelotte – guitar
 Peter Iwers – bass guitar

Additional musicians 
 Andy Greenwood – brass on "Watercolour"
 Andy Wood – brass on "Watercolour"
 Craig Wild – brass on "Watercolour"
 Adrian Revell – brass on "Watercolour"
 Martin Williams – brass on "Watercolour"
 Samantha Beagley – vocals on "The Vulture"

Production and design
 Rob Swire – production, mixing
 Gareth McGrillen – production, except for "Genesis" and "The Fountain"
 Liam Howlett – production on "Immunize"
 Brad Kohn – mixing (drums only) on "Crush" and "Encoder", editing assistant
 Brian "Big Bass" Gardner – mastering
 Storm Thorgerson (in collaboration with Valp Maciej Hajnrich) – artwork

Studios 
 Pendulum HQ – mixing
 Brain Gardner Mastering – mastering

Charts

Weekly charts

Year-end charts

Certifications

Release history

References

External links 
 

2010 albums
Pendulum (drum and bass band) albums
Albums produced by Liam Howlett
Albums with cover art by Storm Thorgerson